Matthew Gilsenan (28 October 1915 – 6 April 2013) was an Irish Gaelic footballer and selector who played as a left wing-forward at senior level for the Meath county team.

Gilsenan made his first appearance for the team during the 1935 championship and was a regular member of the starting fifteen until his retirement after the 1946 championship. During that time he won two Leinster medals. Gilsenan was an All-Ireland runner-up on one occasion.

At club level Gilsenan was a county football championship medalist with moynalty GFC.

In retirement from playing Gilsenan became involved in coaching and team management. He served as a selector at various times between 1939 and 1970, a period which saw Meath win three All-Ireland titles and eleven Leinster titles.

References

 

1915 births
2013 deaths
Gaelic football selectors
Irish farmers
Leinster inter-provincial Gaelic footballers
Meath inter-county Gaelic footballers